Anisomysis is a genus of mysids, first described in 1910 by Hans Jacob Hansen.

Species
Species and subgenera accepted by WoRMS are:

Subgenus Anisomysis (Anisomysis) 
Anisomysis aikawai 
Anisomysis akajimaensis 
Anisomysis australis 
Anisomysis bacescui 
Anisomysis bifurcata 
Anisomysis boraboraensis 
Anisomysis brevicauda 
Anisomysis chessi 
Anisomysis comorensis 
Anisomysis enewetakensis 
Anisomysis extranea 
Anisomysis hanseni 
Anisomysis hashizumei 
Anisomysis hawaiiensis 
Anisomysis incisa 
Anisomysis kunduchiana 
Anisomysis laticauda 
Anisomysis levi 
Anisomysis maldivensis 
Anisomysis megalops 
Anisomysis minuta 
Anisomysis mixta 
Anisomysis mullini 
Anisomysis nana 
Anisomysis neptuni 
Anisomysis parvispina 
Anisomysis pelewensis 
Anisomysis pescaprae 
Anisomysis phuketensis 
Anisomysis quadrispinosa 
Anisomysis robustispina 
Anisomysis rotunda 
Anisomysis sirielloides 
Anisomysis spinaintus 
Anisomysis spinata 
Anisomysis truncata 
Anisomysis unispinosa 
Anisomysis vasseuri 
Subgenus Anisomysis (Carnegieomysis) 
Anisomysis bipartoculata 
Anisomysis hispida 
Anisomysis tattersallae 
Anisomysis xenops 
Subgenus Anisomysis (Javanisomysis) Anisomysis baliensis Anisomysis gutzui Anisomysis lombokensis Anisomysis similis Anisomysis thurneysseni 

Subgenus Anisomysis (Paranisomysis) Anisomysis acuminata Anisomysis arabica Anisomysis constricta Anisomysis gracilis Anisomysis hosakai Anisomysis ijimai Anisomysis laccadivei Anisomysis lamellicauda Anisomysis marisrubri Anisomysis minicoyensis Anisomysis modestiangusta Anisomysis ohtsukai Anisomysis omorii Anisomysis parvisinuosa Anisomysis ryukyuensis Anisomysis spatulispina Anisomysis sudafricana Anisomysis takedai''

References

Crustaceans described in 1910
Taxa named by Hans Jacob Hansen
Mysida
Crustacean genera